Amrum may refer to:

Places
Amrum, one of the North Frisian Islands
Amrum Lighthouse, a lighthouse on Amrum
Amrum Frisian, a dialect spoken on Amrum
Amrumer Mühle, a windmill on Amrum
Amrum Bank, a bank off the coast of Amrum

Ships
, a Kriegsmarine coastal tanker in service 1938-45
, a coaster in service 1926–31